Count , best known by his nickname , was a Japanese statesman and naval engineer during the late Tokugawa shogunate and early Meiji period. Kaishū was a nickname which he took from a piece of calligraphy (Kaishū Shooku ) by Sakuma Shōzan. He was often called  from his ceremonial title  during the late Tokugawa shogunate and later changed his name to Yasuyoshi after the Meiji Restoration.

Katsu Kaishū eventually rose to occupy the position of commissioner (Gunkan-bugyō) in the Tokugawa navy. He is particularly known for his role in the surrender of Edo.

Early life
Born Katsu Yoshikuni on March 12, 1823, in Edo to a low-ranking retainer of the Tokugawa shōgun. His father, Katsu Kokichi, the subject of the autobiography, Musui's Story, was the ill-behaved head of a minor samurai family. As a youth whose given childhood name as Katsu Rintarō (Kaishu was a pseudonym), he studied Dutch and European military science, and was eventually appointed translator by the government when European powers attempted to open contact with Japan. Katsu developed the reputation as an expert in western military technology.

Under the advice of Dutch naval officers, Katsu served as head naval cadet at the Nagasaki Naval Academy between 1855 and 1859.

Military service
In 1860, Katsu served as captain of the warship Kanrin-maru (with assistance from US naval officer Lt. John M. Brooke), to escort the first Japanese delegation to San Francisco, California, en route to Washington, DC, for the formal ratification of the Harris Treaty. The Kanrin Maru, built by the Dutch, was the first Japanese vessel to sail to the Western world. Kaishū remained in San Francisco for nearly two months, observing American society, culture and technology. Following his return to Japan, Katsu held a series of high-ranking posts in the Tokugawa navy, arguing before government councils in favor of a unified Japanese naval force led by professionally trained officers in disregard of promotion and assignment due to hereditary status. During his command as director of the Kobe Naval School, the institute would become a major source of activity for progressive thinking and reformists between 1863 and 1864.

In 1866, Katsu was appointed negotiator between the bakufu forces and the anti-shogunal domain of Chōshū, and later served as chief negotiator for the Tokugawa bakufu, ensuring a relatively peaceful and orderly transition of power in the Meiji Restoration.

Although sympathetic to the anti-Tokugawa cause, Katsu remained loyal to the Tokugawa bakufu during the Boshin War. After the collapse of the Tokugawa forces in late 1867, Katsu negotiated the surrender of Edo castle to Saigō Takamori on 11 April 1868.

Later years
Katsu relocated to Shizuoka after the new Imperial government took control of the shogun's former capital, which was renamed Tokyo ("Eastern Capital"). He returned briefly to government service as Vice Minister of the Imperial Japanese Navy in 1872, followed by first Minister of the Navy from 1873 until 1878. Although his influence within the navy was minimal, as the Navy was largely dominated by a core of Satsuma officers, Katsu served in a senior advisory capacity on national policy. During the next two decades, Katsu served on the Privy Council and wrote extensively on naval issues.

He also made efforts to restore the honor of Tokugawa Yoshinobu and Saigō Takamori.

In 1887, he was elevated to the title of hakushaku (count) in the kazoku peerage system. Katsu recorded his memoirs in the book Hikawa Seiwa.

Death
Following his death in 1899, he was buried with his wife Tami near the site of their home, on the shores of Senzoku Pond, in what is today  in Tokyo.

Honours
Translated from the corresponding article in the Japanese Wikipedia
Count (9 May 1887)

Order of precedence
Fourth rank (15 June 1872)
Senior fourth rank (18 February 1874)
Third rank (December 1887)
Senior third rank (October 1888)
Junior Second rank (30 June 1894)
Senior second rank (20 January 1899; posthumous)
 Grand Cordon of the Order of the Sacred Treasure (December 1889)
 Grand Cordon of the Order of the Rising Sun (26 February 1898)

Gallery

Notes

References
Hillsborough, Romulus. Samurai Revolution: The Dawn of Modern Japan Through the Eyes of the Shogun's Last Samurai. Tuttle, 2013.
Jansen, Marius B. (1961). Sakamoto Ryoma and the Meiji Restoration. Princeton: Princeton University Press. OCLC 413111
Katsu, Kokichi; translated by Teruko Craig. Musui's Story: The Autobiography of a Tokugawa Samurai University of Arizona Press, 1988.
 Nussbaum, Louis-Frédéric and Käthe Roth. (2005).  Japan encyclopedia. Cambridge: Harvard University Press. ; OCLC 58053128

External links

Photographs of Katsu Kaishu
Katsu Kaishu by Romulus Hillsborough 

Japanese swordfighters
1823 births
1899 deaths
Boshin War
Hatamoto
Imperial Japanese Navy officers
Japanese military leaders
Meiji Restoration
People from Tokyo
Samurai
Japanese politicians
Kazoku
People of Meiji-period Japan
Wakadoshiyori
People of the Boshin War
Members of the Japanese Embassy to the United States